Albert Davis may refer to:

Albert Davis (baseball), Negro league baseball player
Albert Davis; see Doug Dickey
Albert Davis Park

See also
Bert Davis (disambiguation)
Al Davis (disambiguation)
Albert Davies (disambiguation)